Daily Mehran is a Sindhi daily newspaper in Sindh, Pakistan.

History
It was founded in 1957. Its headquarter located in Hyderabad, Sindh.

Editors
 Shamsher-ul-Hyderi

See also 
 List of newspapers in Pakistan

References

Mass media in Hyderabad, Sindh
Sindhi-language newspapers
Daily newspapers published in Pakistan
1957 establishments in Pakistan